Zinaida Sendriūtė (born 20 December 1984) is a Lithuanian discus thrower. Her personal best is 65.97 metres, achieved in May 2013 in Kaunas. 

She competed at the 2006 European Championships, 2008 Olympic Games and 2009 World Championships without reaching the final.

Achievements

1No mark in the final

References

1984 births
Living people
Lithuanian female discus throwers
Athletes (track and field) at the 2008 Summer Olympics
Athletes (track and field) at the 2012 Summer Olympics
Athletes (track and field) at the 2016 Summer Olympics
Olympic athletes of Lithuania
World Athletics Championships athletes for Lithuania
Universiade medalists in athletics (track and field)
Universiade silver medalists for Lithuania
Competitors at the 2009 Summer Universiade
Medalists at the 2011 Summer Universiade